Jafarabad-e Jangal (also Romanized as Ja‘farābād-e Jangal) is a village in Behnamarab-e Jonubi Rural District, Javadabad District, Varamin County, Tehran Province, Iran. At the 2006 census, its population was 435, in 107 families.

References 

Populated places in Varamin County